The 2014–15 Biathlon World Cup – Individual Women started on Thursday December 4, 2014 in Östersund and finished on Wednesday March 11, 2015 at the World Championships in Kontiolahti. The defending titlist Gabriela Soukalová of Czech Republic finished on the 6th place. Kaisa Mäkäräinen of Finland won the title.

Competition format
The  individual race is the oldest biathlon event; the distance is skied over five laps. The biathlete shoots four times at any shooting lane, in the order of prone, standing, prone, standing, totalling 20 targets. For each missed target a fixed penalty time, usually one minute, is added to the skiing time of the biathlete. Competitors' starts are staggered, normally by 30 seconds.

2013–14 Top 3 Standings

Medal winners

Standings

References

Individual Women